Calophyllum polyanthum is a species of plant belonging to the genus Calophyllum of the family Calophyllaceae, commonly called the poonspar tree, sirpoon tree, punnapine, pinnapai, punnappine, kattupunna and malampunna. This plant Growing abundance in the Western Ghats in India (Assam (Barak Valley), Kerala). It is also found in Andaman & Nicobar Island, Bangladesh, Bhutan, Laos, Myanmar, Thailand and Vietnam.

Description 
Calophyllum polyanthum is much branched tall trees, up to 45 m tall. Wood are very tough. Bark grey to brown. Outer bark is yellowish, with strong. Stems are branches and branchlets quadrangular, glabrous. Leaves are simple, opposite, decussate; petiole 0.8-2.5 cm long, narrowly margined. It bearing white flowers, fragrant, in panicles. Fruits and seeds are drupe, ellipsoid, apiculate, to 3.7 cm long, one seeded. Fruits are yellow and dark purple at maturity. Flowering and fruiting season is from June to September.

Uses 
The wood is used  construction, paper pulp, and furniture making. The timber is also used for making tea chests, tent poles, mathematical instruments, construction of ghat roads particularly leading to the sea coast. Seeds are used for illuminating purpose. Fruits are edible. Wood is anti-termitic.

Diseases
Calophyllum species are susceptible to various insect pests, virus and fungi, affecting leaves, fruits and roots.

References 

polyanthum
Plants described in 1849
Taxa named by Jacques Denys Choisy